The Felice Brothers are an American folk rock/country rock band from New York.

History
The Felice Brothers got their start as a band playing in the New York City subway.  They lived in a little apartment in Brooklyn and would play in the subway stations at 42nd Street and Union Square and in Greenwich Village.  The three brothers originally hail from Palenville, New York in the Catskill Mountains.

Now they tour the country, traveling in their "Short Bus".  Their 2006 self-released debut album was Through These Reins and Gone followed by Tonight at the Arizona released in 2007 through Loose.  Through These Reins and Gone made it onto Radio Woodstock WDST's top 25 albums of 2006.  About their album  Adventures of the Felice Brothers Vol. 1 James Felice said, "We put one record out on an English label (Loose), and we've released all the other stuff ourselves" (on their label 'New York Pro'). The Felice Brothers have played at Levon Helm's Midnight Ramble in Woodstock, New York and also toured with Bright Eyes in the fall of 2007.

2008 

On January 7, it was announced The Felice Brothers had signed a record deal with Team Love Records in the US. They toured the United States extensively during the spring (February through mid-April), to promote their new album. The Brothers played at Mountain Jam at Hunter Mountain again this year. They also played at the 2008 Clearwater Festival, Bonnaroo in Manchester, Tennessee, the Philadelphia Folk Festival in Schwenksville, Pennsylvania, All Points West Music and Arts Festival at Liberty State Park in Jersey City, and Outside lands music and arts festival in San Francisco, the latter two festivals being inaugural events.

In August, the band performed at the legendary Newport Folk Festival. Due to torrential rains, high winds, and lightning storms, power was cut to the entire Newport, Rhode Island area. As the stage the band was performing on had no generators, the band played unplugged. They performed for over an hour with such songs as "Frankie's Gun!" and a sing-a-long to "This Land Is Your Land".

2009 
The Felice Brothers joined Old Crow Medicine Show, Justin Townes Earle and the Dave Rawlings Machine for a nine-city package tour called The Big Surprise Tour, after the lead track from the Yonder Is the Clock album.  Kicking off on August 4, 2009 at the Casino Ballroom in Hampton Beach, New Hampshire, the tour travelled around the eastern United States before wrapping up at the World's Fair Park in Knoxville, Tennessee, on August 14, 2009.

2010 
The Felice Brothers opened for the Dave Matthews Band at four concerts in Canada and the US, starting at the Molson Amphitheatre in Toronto on June 1, 2010. They also appeared at the Hardly Strictly Bluegrass Festival in San Francisco on October 3. In late September and early October the band reunited for four shows with Conor Oberst. All the shows were in California. They appeared at the End of the Road Festival, Larmer Tree Gardens, Dorset, England in September.

2011 
The Felice Brothers released the single "Ponzi" on March 29. It was the first single from their newest album "Celebration, Florida" which released on May 10 on Fat Possum (USA) and May 23 on Loose in Europe.

2012 
The Felice Brothers released a collection of songs on July 18 entitled "God Bless You, Amigo". It is a mixture of previously unreleased original songs and covers of classic folk songs. Shortly thereafter drummer Dave Turbeville was replaced by drummer David Estabrook.

2013 

On December 30, 2013, Dell launched their commercial called "Beginnings." It was made by Y&R, New York advertising agency, and features a cover of The Drifters' hit "This Magic Moment" performed by The Felice Brothers.

Personnel
The band has two main members, Ian and James Felice. Former members include their brother Simone Felice, their friend Josh "Christmas Clapton" Rawson, frequently described as a traveling dice player, fiddle player Greg Farley, and drummer David Estabrook. At other times, they have featured a horn section in the band, composed of local Hudson Valley musicians.  Ian is the main vocalist and plays the guitar and piano. James contributes vocals and plays the accordion, organ, and piano. Christmas plays the bass guitar.  Dave Turbeville played the drums from 2009-2012, performing on Celebration, Florida, Poughkeepsie Princess, Mixtape, and God Bless You, Amigo. Simone Felice was the drummer as well as a vocalist and a guitarist. Simone is also an author, having released books entitled Goodbye Amelia,  Hail Mary, Full of Holes and Black Jesus. Simone Felice left the Felice Brothers in 2009. He now leads his own band - The Duke & the King (named after the duo of con-artists in Mark Twain's Adventures of Huckleberry Finn) with Robert "Chicken" Burke. They released their debut album - Nothing Gold Can Stay on Loose / Ramseur Records August 4, 2009, followed by Long Live the Duke & King in 2010. Simone released a self-titled album in 2012, followed that up with an album titled Strangers in 2014, and then released his third album titled The Projector in 2018.

Discography

Cultural references
The end of the song "Frankie's Gun!" is featured in the British sitcom Outnumbered'''s 2009 Christmas Special, where all the family are seen singing along to it in the closing sequence.
The song "Whiskey In My Whiskey" is playing on the jukebox in Merlotte's bar in episode 7 of the first season of True Blood'' on HBO.
The song "Penn Station" was featured in the weather section on the Welcome to Night Vale podcast in 2014

References

American folk rock groups
Team Love Records artists
Fat Possum Records artists
Musical groups established in 2006
Dualtone Records artists
Musical groups from New York City
Loose Music artists
Yep Roc Records artists